Danmarks Næste Topmodel, or simply Topmodel, was a Danish reality television show and an adaptation of America's Next Top Model, created by Tyra Banks. It began to be broadcast on Kanal 4 with Caroline Fleming being the host. After the fifth season, Fleming announced that she would not continue hosting the show. She was replaced by Cecilie Lassen for season 6.

Judges

Cycles

See also
 Top Model (Scandinavia)

References

External links
Official Website (Cycles 1-3)

 tvtvtv.dk

 
Danish reality television series
2010 Danish television series debuts
2015 Danish television series endings
Danish television series based on American television series
Danish-language television shows
Kanal 4 original programming